A lens is an optical element which converges or diverges light.

Lens may also refer to:

Optics 
 Lens (anatomy), a part of the eye
 Corrective lens for correction of human vision
 Contact lens, placed on the cornea of the eye
 Camera lens, a lens designed for use on a camera

Other radiation focus and forces 
 Gravitational lens, a massive astronomical object which causes visual distortions
 Electrostatic lens, a device used to focus or collimate electron beams
 Explosive lens, a shaped explosive charge with focused blast

Places 
 Lens, Pas-de-Calais, a city in Northern France 
 Arrondissement of Lens, an arrondissement in the Pas-de-Calais département of France
 RC Lens, a football (soccer) club from Lens, France
 Lens, Belgium
 Lens, Valais, Switzerland

Science 
 Lens (plant), the genus of the lentil plant
 Lens (geometry), a geometric shape formed from two arcs
 Lens (geology), a body of ore or rock that is thick in the middle and thin at the edges
 Lens (hydrology), a layer of fresh water derived from rainfall, overlying saline groundwater
 Kamera lens (biology), a unicellular, flagellate organism and the only species of the genus Kamera.
 Ice lens

Computing 
 Filter (social media), sometimes called a lens
 Google Lens, an augmented reality feature for smartphones
 Office Lens, a document scanning feature part of Microsoft Office
 Bidirectional transformation in computer science

Other uses 
 Lens (film), a 2016 Indian film made simultaneously in Malayalam and Tamil
 "Lens" (song), by Alanis Morissette, 2012
 The Lens, an online patent search facility and knowledge resource
 The Lens (band), a predecessor of IQ, a British neo-progressive rock group
 The Lens (website), in-depth news and investigations for New Orleans, USA
 European Laboratory for Non-Linear Spectroscopy (LENS)
 Laser engineered net shaping, a rapid prototyping technology capable of building fully dense metal parts
 Lens (surname)
 Lens, a fictional alien device in E. E. Smith's Lensman series
 Perspective (cognitive)

See also 

 Len (disambiguation)
 Lense (disambiguation)